Markovsky (masculine; Cyrillic: Марковский), Markovskaya (feminine; Марковская), or Markovskoye (neuter; Марковское) may refer to the following rural localities in Russia: 

Markovsky, Perm Krai
Markovsky, Republic of Bashkortostan
Markovsky, Volgograd Oblast
Markovskaya, Kaduysky District, Vologda Oblast
Markovskaya, Syamzhensky District, Vologda Oblast
Markovskaya, Verkhovazhsky District, Vologda Oblast 
Markovskoye, Mezhdurechensky District, Vologda Oblast
Markovskoye, Sokolsky District, Vologda Oblast

See also
Markov
Marković
Markovits
Markovski